Shida Leni (born 22 May 1994) is a Ugandan sprinter.

Early life 
Shida was born in Arua in 1994 as the daughter of Abdulatif Tiyua, a retired military officer and former deputy commander the West Nile Bank Front rebel group.

Career 
After Kevin and Sue O'Connor began coaching Shida in August 2013, she represented Uganda at the 2014 Commonwealth Games in Glasgow reaching the semifinals. This was her first competition outside of Uganda. In February 2018, in Kampala, she ran 52.47 to break the 12-year-old 400m National Record. She has now broken this record on 7 occasions, most recently at the 2019 National Championships (51.47), where she also broke the 12-year-old 200m National Record with a time of 23.43. Shida's most notable international achievement was 400m Silver Medal (51.64) at the 2019 World University Games held in Naples, Italy.

She competed at the 2020 Summer Olympics.

International competitions

Personal bests

Outdoor
200 metres – 23.43 (Kampala 2019) (National Record)
400 metres – 51.47 (Kampala 2019) (National Record)
800 metres – 2:13.20 (Gavardo 2017)

References

1994 births
Living people
People from Arua District
Ugandan female sprinters
Athletes (track and field) at the 2014 Commonwealth Games
Commonwealth Games competitors for Uganda
Athletes (track and field) at the 2015 African Games
Athletes (track and field) at the 2019 African Games
Universiade medalists for Uganda
Universiade medalists in athletics (track and field)
Competitors at the 2017 Summer Universiade
Medalists at the 2019 Summer Universiade
African Games competitors for Uganda
Athletes (track and field) at the 2020 Summer Olympics
African Games medalists in athletics (track and field)
African Games bronze medalists for Uganda
Olympic female sprinters
Olympic athletes of Uganda
20th-century Ugandan women
21st-century Ugandan women